Yoon Bo-ra (born December 30, 1989), better known by the mononym Bora, is a South Korean singer, rapper and actress. She is a former member of the South Korean girl group Sistar and its sub-group Sistar19.

Early life and education
Bora was born on December 30, 1989, in Seoul. She majored in Musical Theater in Myongji University, and graduated in February 2015.

Career

2010–2011: Sistar and Sistar19

In June 2010, Bora made her debut as a member of Sistar on KBS' Music Bank with their debut single, Push Push.

In 2011, Bora and group member Hyolyn formed as a sub-group Sistar19 with the single "Ma Boy".

2011–2013: Variety programs
On October 17, 2011, it was revealed that Bora would be part of the new season of KBS2's Invincible Youth. The first episode of Invincible Youth 2 aired on November 11.

On October 21, 2012, it was revealed that Bora would join one of four groups that would perform a new song for the SBS' Gayo Daejeon music spectacular. As part of Mystic White, Bora released the charity song "Mermaid Princess" on December 26, 2012.

In 2013, Bora joined SBS's fashion program Fashion King Korea, where the cast members would team up with professional fashion designers to design and produce fashion items. The same year, she was announced as a fixed host for KBS' music program Music Bank alongside Park Seo-joon.
On December 21, 2013, Bora won Best Rookie Award  at the 2013 KBS Entertainment Awards for her work in Music Bank.

2014–2017: Television show and series appearances and contract end
In 2014, Bora made her acting debut in medical drama Doctor Stranger.

In January 2015, Bora was the new MC for KBS2's fashion and beauty show, A Style For You together with Heechul, Hara, and Hani. In April, she collaborated with Unpretty Rapstar contestants Kisum, Lil Cham, Jace, and male artist Adoonga for a hip-hop single titled "Feedback". She then starred in web dramas, Flatterer and High-End Crush. In November 2015, Bora joined the cast of SBS' survival show Law of the Jungle.

In June 2016, Bora was a contestant of Mnet's dance competition show, Hit the Stage.

In March 2017, it was announced that Bora would make her big screen debut in the family comedy film Sunkist Family. In June 2017, Bora signed a contract under Hook Entertainment as an actress going by her full name, leaving Starship Entertainment after seven years of being in Sistar. In November 2017, Bora was cast in tvN's fantasy drama A Korean Odyssey.

2018–present: Special MC, television show, series appearance and new label 
In July 2018, Bora appeared as the special MC for Produce 48 on episode 6 and 7. She also appeared as one-day healing mentor on episode 11. In November 2018, Bora was cast in OCN's Quiz of God - Season 5 : Reboot.

In January 2020, Bora was cast in SBS' Dr. Romantic Season 2. In August 2020, It was revealed that Bora has left Hook Entertainment and signed with KeyEast Entertainment. In October 2020, Bora was announced as the ambassador of AIA Vitality. In November 2020, it was announced that Bora was cast in MBC's Late Night Café Season 2, Hit Up! Hit Up! as the female lead.

In January 2021, it was revealed that Bora will be the host for GlanceTV's beauty show, Unnie's Beauty Carpool together with Hyoyeon.

Discography

Filmography

Film

Television series

Variety show

Awards and nominations

References

External links 

 Official website 

Sistar members
1989 births
Living people
People from Seoul
Actresses from Seoul
Singers from Seoul
South Korean female idols
South Korean television actresses
South Korean film actresses
South Korean women pop singers
South Korean television personalities
South Korean web series actresses
Myongji University alumni
Starship Entertainment artists